Crispin Lipscomb (born August 7, 1979 in Edmonton, Alberta) is a Canadian snowboarder, specializing in the halfpipe event.

Lipscomb made his World Cup debut in December 2002 at Whistler, and made his first podium later that season, with a bronze at Serre Chevalier. His first World Cup victory came in 2006, at Furano.

Lipscomb has claimed 5 World Cup medals over his career, including two victories, and his best season came in 2005, when he placed 5th overall in the halfpipe standings. He has competed at three FIS Snowboarding World Championships, with his best finish a 6th in 2007.

Lipscomb competed at the 2006 Winter Olympics, in the halfpipe. He was the only Canadian halfpiper to advance to a final, after finishing 6th in the second qualifying round. His best run in the final scored 33.5 points, enough for 11th place.

In January 2010, Lipscomb announced his intention to move on from competing at the World Cup level, citing the death of a close friend as changing his outlook on the sport.

World Cup Podiums

References

External links
FIS profile

1979 births
Living people
Canadian male snowboarders
Olympic snowboarders of Canada
Snowboarders at the 2006 Winter Olympics
Snowboarders at the 2014 Winter Olympics
Sportspeople from Edmonton